"Look It Up" is a song written by Robert Ellis Orrall and Angaleena Presley, and  originally recorded by Australian country music artist Jasmine Rae in 2008. It was later recorded by American country music artist Ashton Shepherd, whose version was released in January 2011 as the lead-off single to her album Where Country Grows.

Content
"Look It Up" is a moderate up-tempo country song. The song's female narrator expresses her dissatisfaction with being done wrong by her man who has been seeing another woman. She tells him multiple words dealing with his wrongdoing (such as 'liar,' 'forgiveness,' and 'faithful') and suggests he "look [them] up."

Shepherd described it as, "a song about somebody who is officially done with something to the point that they are really over it. It's almost like they aren't that mad anymore, just ready to be through with it, just done. 'Done' is a good word."

Critical reception
Stephen M. Deusner of Engine 145 gave the song a thumbs up, favorably describing the lyrics as "clever" and complimenting Shepherd's "intense twang." Kevin John Coyne of Country Universe gave it a C rating, calling the song "outdated." He also stated that while "Ashton Shepherd is bringing country back to country, [...] a dull vocal isn’t improved by exaggerated twang. It just sounds forced."

Music video
The video was directed by Michael Salomon and was released a few days after the single was sent to radio. In it, Shepherd's former love interest is shown coming home to find her having a yard sale to get rid of all his possessions. He confronts her about it, only to have her confront him about his cheating. He spends the rest of the video trying to take back his stuff from the customers while Shepherd advises him to look up words that describe his infidelity. Additionally, scenes of Shepherd performing the song from within a garage are included.

Chart performance
"Look It Up" debuted at number 55 on the U.S. Billboard Hot Country Songs chart for the week of January 15, 2011. It reached a peak of number 19 on the chart dated May 28, 2011.

Year-end charts

References

2011 singles
2008 songs
Ashton Shepherd songs
Songs written by Robert Ellis Orrall
Song recordings produced by Buddy Cannon
Music videos directed by Michael Salomon
MCA Nashville Records singles
Songs written by Angaleena Presley